Raigarh district is a district of the central Indian state of Chhattisgarh. Raigarh is the district headquarters.

The district was formed by merging the princely states of Raigarh, Sakti, Sarangarh, Udaipur and Jashpur. Jashpur is now a separate district. Sakti is now not a part of Raigarh district.

It is rapidly growing as an industrial district of Chhattisgarh. One of the oldest jute mills of India is situated here, Mohan jute mill; it was the only Jute Mill of the state Chhattisgarh and undivided Madhya Pradesh. Raigarh is one of the major producers of steel and power in the country. Here are situated many steel and power plants such as JSPL, MSP, Monnet steel, and many other small and medium producers. The volume can be judged by the statement that Raigarh itself is consuming about 20,000 tons of coal per day.

Administration 
Raigarh district has 9 tehsils:

 Raigarh
 Udaipur (Dharamjaigarh)
 Kharsia
 Pusour
 Lailunga
 Tamnar
 Gharghoda

Demographics

According to the 2011 census Raigarh district has a population of 1,493,984, roughly equal to the nation of Gabon or the US state of Hawaii. This gives it a ranking of 336th in India (out of a total of 640). Its population growth rate over the decade 2001-2011 was 18.02%. Raigarh has a sex ratio of 993 females for every 1000 males, and a literacy rate of 73.7%.

After bifurcation the district had a population of 1,112,982. 19.66% of the population lives in urban areas. Scheduled Castes and Scheduled Tribes make up 126,349 (11.35%) and 443,752 (39.87%) of the population respectively.

Languages

At the time of the 2011 Census of India, 72.34% of the population in the district spoke Chhattisgarhi, 8.63% Odia, 8.32% Hindi, 5.29% Kurukh, 1.07% Bengali and 1.04% Bhojpuri as their first language.

Languages spoken here include Asuri, an Austroasiatic language spoken by approximately 17,000.

References

External links

 Raigarh District homepage

 
Districts of Chhattisgarh
1948 establishments in India